was a samurai of the Heian period (794 – 1185) in the service of Minamoto no Yorimitsu (948 – 1021), a regent of the Fujiwara clan. Suetake assisted Yorimitsu throughout his life, being referred to as one of Shitennō, or "Four Guardian Kings" of Yorimitsu. Suetake originated from the House of Seiryū (Blue Dragon). In addition to Suetake, the other Shitennō of Yorimitsu were Usui Sadamitsu, Kintarō, and Watanabe no Tsuna.

Suetake is the subject of a tale in the Konjaku Monogatarishū, a collection of folk legends compiled in the late Heian period. The Japanese tale in which Suetake appears is known as Ōeyama. He died in 1022 at the age of 73.

References 

Samurai